Berth Idoffs is a dansband from Bromölla, Sweden, established in 1955.

Former members
Inge Svensson - guitar  
Kjell Gummesson - drums
Berth Idoff - keyboards
Conny Nilsson - vocals, guitar (1972-2000)
Göte Färm - drums 
Mats Westerberg - bass, guitar (1987-1998)
Magnus Persson - keyboard, guitar, accordion, vocals (1982-1992)
Bo Jansson - bass, clarinet, saxophone, keyboards (1992-199?)
Mats Dahlström - guitar, saxophone (1985-1992)
Bengt-Erik Skantz - Keyboards, saxophone (1992-?)
Jesper Svensson - keyboard, bass (1996 - 2000)
Patrick Bertilsson - drums (1997 - 2000)
Martin Wahlström - bass
Johannes Nordgren - guitar, saxophone
Conny Norrman - Keyboard
Mats Thuresson - Saxophone, Kapellmeister (1983-1985)

Current members
Charlotte "Lotta" Idoffson - vocals
Patrik "Palle" Ohlsson - Guitar, pedalsteel and violin
Henric "Hebbe" Svensson - Keyboard, saxophone, accordion
Marcus "Idoff" Idoffson - Kapellmeister, guitar, vocals and accordion
Fredrik Ohlsson - drums, vocals

Discography

Albums
Sjung, dansa och le - 1975 
Dansglädje 86 - 1986
Dansglädje 87 - 1987
Dansglädje 88 - 1988
Dansglädje 89 - 1989
Dansglädje 90 - 1990
Jag behöver dej - 1991
För din skull - 1993
En lyckostund - 2000
Lätt för mig - 2011

Svensktoppen songs
Små, små ord - 1988
Nere vid kusten - 1990
Kärlek på gång - 1996
Evelina - 1999

Tested for Svensktoppen, failed to enter chart
Spelemän - 1997
När du rör vid mig - 1998
En lyckostund - 2000

References

External links
Official website

1955 establishments in Sweden
Dansbands
Musical groups established in 1955